Le Lys dans la Vallée (English: The Lily of the Valley) is an 1835 novel about love and society by French novelist and playwright Honoré de Balzac (1799–1850). It concerns the affection — emotionally vibrant but never consummated — between Félix de Vandenesse and Henriette de Mortsauf. It is part of his series of novels (or Roman-fleuve) known as La Comédie humaine (The Human Comedy), which parodies and depicts French society in the period of the Bourbon Restoration and the July Monarchy (1815–1848). In his novel he also mentions the château Azay-le-Rideau, which can still be visited today.

Inspiration
Henriette de Mortsauf was modelled on Balzac's close friend Laure Antoinette de Berny (née Hinner), a woman 22 years his senior who greatly encouraged his early career. Mme. de Berny died shortly after reading the completed novel — in which Henriette also dies.

References

External links

  Le Lys dans la vallée, audio version 

1835 French novels
Books of La Comédie humaine
Novels by Honoré de Balzac